Sára Bejlek was the defending champion and successfully defended her title, defeating Lina Gjorcheska in the final, 6–2, 7–6(7–0).

Seeds
All seeds receive a bye into the second round.

Draw

Finals

Top half

Section 1

Section 2

Bottom half

Section 3

Section 4

References

External links
Main draw

ITS Cup - Singles